Oguz may refer to:

Oğuz (name), a Turkish name
Oghuz Rayon, (Azerbaijani: Oğuz), an administrative division of Azerbaijan
Oğuz, a city, municipality and capital of Oghuz Rayon, Azerbaijan
 Oğuzlar, a Turkic nomad tribe

See also
Oghuz (disambiguation)